Sepaktakraw at the 2011 Southeast Asian Games were held in Palembang, Indonesia.

Medal summary

Results

Men's Double Regu

Preliminary round

Group A

Group B

Knockout round

Men's Regu

Preliminary round

Group A

Group B

Knockout round

Men's team

Preliminary round

Women's Double Regu

Preliminary round

Group X

Group Y

Knockout round

Women's Regu

Preliminary round

Group X

Group Y

Knockout round

Women's team

Preliminary round

References
SEAG2011 Start/Result Lists - Sepak Takraw

2011
2011 Southeast Asian Games events